Delta Stream is a small meltwater stream flowing from Howard Glacier into Lake Fryxell in Taylor Valley, Victoria Land. It was first studied on the ground by Troy L. Pewe during U.S. Navy Operation Deepfreeze, 1957–58, and so named by him because the stream has a series of deltas along its length which have been cut through as the stream was rejuvenated, the rejuvenation being caused by the lowering of the former glacial lake.

References

Rivers of Victoria Land
McMurdo Dry Valleys